Tanglefoot was a Canadian folk band from Owen Sound, Ontario. Formed in the early 1980s by schoolteachers Joe Grant, Bob Wagar, and Tim Rowat to play traditional music, they became a five-piece band playing largely original music. They regularly toured Canada, the United States, and the United Kingdom.

Overview 
The band has toured frequently throughout Canada and the United States, and also regularly in the UK. The band's song subjects are largely derived from history, especially Canadian history. Subject have included the Frank Slide, The War of 1812, Laura Secord, the first flight in Canada, and the tale of Sir John A Macdonald's wife Agnes Macdonald riding the cowcatcher across Canada.

Tanglefoot's lineup from 2007 on was: Steve Ritchie (guitar and whistle), the band's longest-serving member, Al Parrish (double bass), Terry Young (multi-instrumentalist incl guitar, mandolin, banjo, harmonica, whistle), Sandra Swannell (fiddle and viola), and Rob Ritchie (piano), returning after a five-year hiatus to replace departing pianist Bryan Weirmier. All the members sang and all, to varying degrees, wrote for the band.

After performing for nearly three decades, Tanglefoot ended their run with a pair of farewell concerts at the Roxy Theatre in Owen Sound, Ontario. In a comment on 27 June 2009 Al Parrish said that there was no bitterness in the breakup, but after more than twenty years the time had come to call it a day. Parrish also said there was a possibility of reunion gigs in the future, but nothing was planned.

In October 2010 all five band members appeared together back at the Roxy Theatre for a leukemia fundraiser. The concert was billed as "The My Sweet Patootie Show with special guests, Al Parrish, Rob Ritchie & Steve Ritchie". Organized by former Tanglefoot members Sandra Swannell and Terry Young (who now perform as My Sweet Patootie), the concert featured all five performers in a variety of configurations but they played only a couple of Tanglefoot songs and the event was not particularly a "Tanglefoot reunion".

In September 2012 the founding members of Tanglefoot (Joe Grant, Tim Rowat and Bob Wagar) were inducted into the Pathway of Fame in Peterborough, Ontario.

Three longstanding members of Tanglefoot – guitarist/vocalist Steve Ritchie, bassist/vocalist Al Parrish and keyboardist/vocalist Rob Ritchie teamed up with drummer/percussionist/vocalist Beaker Granger in 2012 and currently perform and record as RPR.

Members

Discography 
Dance Like Flames – Released by Borealis Records in 2006; BCD-179CD
Way More Live – Released on DVD by Borealis Records in 2004; BDVD001
Captured Alive – Released by Borealis Records in 2003; BCD-157CD
Agnes on the Cowcatcher – Released by Borealis Records in 2002; BCD-143CD
Full Throated Abandon – Released by Borealis Records in 1999; BCD-115CD
The Music in the Wood – Released by Tanglefoot Media in 1996; TML14-0896CD
Voyageurs et Vagabonds: Songs of the Voyageurs – Released by Ooze River Music 1995; ORM8-989
Saturday Night in Hardwood Lake – Released by Tanglefoot Media in 1994; TML12-1194CD
Grain of Salt – Released by Ooze River Music 1992; ORM11-1192CD
Voyageurs & Vagabonds (cassette) – Released by Ooze River Music 1987; ORM5-287
Songs of the River (cassette) – Released by Ooze River Music 1984; ORM-002
''Igg's Pig: Songs and Stories for Young Canadians' – Released by Waterloo Music 1984; WR-8030

References

External links 
 
 [ Allmusic]'s article on Tanglefoot
 My Sweet Patootie web site
 RPR web site
 Al Parrish web site
 Steve Ritchie web site
 Rob Ritchie web site
 Bryan Weirmier web site

Canadian Folk Music Award winners
Canadian folk rock groups
Musical groups from Ontario
Owen Sound
Musical groups established in 1979
Musical groups disestablished in 2009
1979 establishments in Ontario
2009 disestablishments in Ontario